Tarcan may refer to:

 Selim Sırrı Tarcan (1874-1957), Turkish educator, sports official and politician
 The Amazing Race Canada (TARCan)

See also
Tarkan (disambiguation)
Tarkhan